Omer Braeckeveldt (10 October 1917 – 6 August 1987) was a Belgian road cyclist, who competed as a professional from 1949 to 1955. He most notably won the first stage of the 1950 Vuelta a España, and held the leader's jersey for the first four stages.

Major results

1949
 3rd Nationale Sluitingprijs
 6th Kampioenschap van Vlaanderen
1950
 Vuelta a España
1st Stage 1
Held  after Stages 1–4
 2nd Nationale Sluitingprijs
 2nd Wingene Koers
 3rd Circuit Houtland–Torhout
1951
 3rd Overall Tour of Belgium
 5th Circuit des XI Villes
1952
 5th Nationale Sluitingprijs
 6th Kampioenschap van Vlaanderen
1953
 1st Stadsprijs Geraardsbergen
 1st Wingene Koers
 2nd Omloop Mandel-Leie-Schelde
 3rd Roubaix–Huy
1954
 1st Gullegem Koerse
 1st Wingene Koers
 4th Overall Tour of Belgium

References

External links
 

1917 births
1987 deaths
Belgian male cyclists
People from Tielt
Belgian Vuelta a España stage winners
Cyclists from West Flanders